is a biography based on the Japanese singer Kyu Sakamoto's life. The movie was first broadcast on TV Tokyo on August 21, 2005 as a commemoration of the 20th anniversary of Sakamoto's death.

Plot summary
The movie follows Sakamoto's life from being 3 years old to a teenager and finally a family father.
The plot focuses on many well known things about his life such as the background of the popular song "Sukiyaki" (J: "Ue o muite arukō") and his death in the Japan Airlines Flight 123 plane crash in 1985. It also brings up some more obscure aspects such as surviving a car accident, how he met his wife Yukiko Kashiwagi as well as his time in the Japanese band Paradise King.

Cast
 Tatsuya Yamaguchi - Kyu Sakamoto (Adult)
 Watanabe Takuto - Kyu Sakamoto (Boy) 
 Rie Tomosaka - Yukiko Kashiwagi
 Ikko Furuya - Yutaka Sakamoto (Kyus father)
 Kumiko Okae - Iku Sakamoto (Kyus mother)
 Akira Saitō - Seri Oshima (Kyus grandmother)

See also
Kyu Sakamoto
Yukiko Kashiwagi
Hanako Oshima

External links

Japanese television films
Films with screenplays by James Miki
2000s Japanese films